Bobillier is a tiny, cup-shaped lunar impact crater in the southwest part of Mare Serenitatis. It was named after French geometer Étienne Bobillier in 1976. It lies to the north-northwest of the crater Bessel. To the south and west is a wrinkle ridge designated Dorsum Buckland. Bobillier was previously identified as Bessel E.

References

External links

Bobillier at The Moon Wiki

Impact craters on the Moon
Mare Serenitatis